Chrysops subcaecutiens is a species of deer fly in the family Tabanidae.

Distribution
Mexico.

References

Tabanidae
Insects described in 1859
Diptera of North America
Taxa named by Luigi Bellardi